A Necklace for My Beloved ( translit. Samkauli satrposatvis) is a 1971 Georgian comedy-drama film directed by Tengiz Abuladze and co-written with Tamaz Meliava.

Cast
Ramaz Giorgobiani as Bahadur
Nani Bregvadze as Aisha
Erosi Manjgaladze as Duldurum 
Gogi Gegechkori as Gendarme 
Ramaz Chkhikvadze as Daud
Eteri Abzianidze as Saltanat
Leonid Yengibarov as Sugur 
Kakhi Kavsadze as Zaur
Otar Megvinetukhutsesi as Mahomed
Davit Kobulovi	as Khasbulat 
N. Qvlividze as Serminaz 
Temuri Chkhikvadze as Aziz
Leomer Gugushvili as Detective 
Irakli Nijaradze as Tongue-tied old man 
Irina Shestua	asChata

References

External links
 

Comedy-drama films from Georgia (country)
Georgian-language films
1971 films
1971 comedy-drama films
Soviet comedy-drama films
Films directed by Tengiz Abuladze
Soviet-era films from Georgia (country)